Peter Rylands (18 January 1820 – 8 February 1887) was an English wire-manufacturer in Lancashire and a Liberal politician who was active in local government and sat in the House of Commons in two periods between 1868 and 1887.

Life
Rylands was born at Warrington, the son of John Rylands and his wife Martha Glazebrook, daughter of the Rev. James Glazebrook, vicar of Belton. He was educated at Boteler's Grammar School, Warrington. He was a wire manufacturer and active in local government. As early as 1843 he was corresponding with Richard Cobden on political matters.  He was Mayor of Warrington from 1853 to 1854. He had directorships of the Manchester and Liverpool Banking Co., of the Bridgewater Navigation Co., of Pearson and Knowles Coal and Iron Co., Limited, and of Rylands Brothers, Limited, iron masters and wire manufacturers. He was a J.P. for Cheshire and Lancashire.

At the 1868 general election Rylands was elected Member of Parliament (MP) for Warrington. He was a member of the Royal Commission on Contagious Diseases in 1872. He lost his Warrington seat at the 1874 general election, when he also stood unsuccessfully in the South-Eastern Division of Lancashire. In 1876 he won a parliamentary by-election in Burnley, where he was re-elected in 1880 and 1885.  When the Liberals split over the First Home Rule Bill, Rylands joined the breakaway Liberal Unionists, and was returned to the House of Commons at the 1886 general election as a Liberal Unionist. He held the seat until his death on 8 February 1887 at the age of 67.

Rylands lived at Massey Hall, Thelwall which he left to the local authority for educational purposes.

Rylands married twice. He had three sons by his second wife Caroline Reynolds, whom he married in 1861. His eldest son, the author L. Gordon Rylands, published an edition of his letters. A grandson was the academic Dadie Rylands.

References

External links 
   Dictionary of National Biography, 1885-1900, Volume 50, Rylands, Peter
 
 

1820 births
1887 deaths
Liberal Party (UK) MPs for English constituencies
UK MPs 1868–1874
UK MPs 1874–1880
UK MPs 1880–1885
UK MPs 1885–1886
UK MPs 1886–1892
People educated at Boteler Grammar School
People from Warrington
Liberal Unionist Party MPs for English constituencies
Politics of Burnley
Mayors of Warrington